ARN Regional is an Australian regional radio network founded after the purchase of a group of radio stations from Grant Broadcasters by ARN parent Here, There & Everywhere. It includes a small number of metropolitan radio stations.

History
Grant Broadcasters was founded by Walter Grant in 1942 when he bought 2DU in Dubbo. In 1972 a shareholding in 2ST in Nowra was purchased followed in 1979 by 2PK in Parkes and in 1982 2MG in Mudgee. In 1986 2DU, 2PK and 2MG were sold with full ownership taken of 2ST. Over the next three decades, the company expanded through acquisition, purchasing radio stations in all states and territories of Australia, owning 53 stations by November 2021. In January 2022, Here, There & Everywhere purchased 46 stations from Grant Broadcasters and integrated these into its ARN business. The deal was finalised on 4 January 2022.

Radio stations

Contemporary Hits Radio (CHR)
Hot 100 100.1 FM and DAB+ - Darwin, translators at Adelaide River 102.1 FM, and Katherine 765 AM
Hot Tomato, Gold Coast

Chilli FM
90.1 Chilli FM 90.1 FM - Launceston, translator at Launceston City 101.1 FM
99.7 Chilli FM 99.7 FM - Scottsdale, translators at Weldborough 94.5 FM, St Marys 103.5 FM and St Helens 90.5 FM

Magic FM
Magic FM 89.9 FM - Port Lincoln, translator at Cleve on 97.1 FM
Magic FM 93.1 FM - Berri, translator at Waikerie on 97.1 FM
Magic FM 105.9 FM - Spencer Gulf, translator at Roxby Downs on 100.3 FM and Quorn on 100.7 FM

Power FM Network
Power FM 102.5 FM - Bega, translator at Batemans Bay 104.3 FM
Power FM 98.1 FM - Muswellbrook, translator at Merriwa 102.7 FM
Power FM 94.9 FM - Nowra
Power FM 103.1 FM - Ballarat
Power FM 98.7 FM - Murray Bridge, South Australia, translators at Mount Barker 100.3 FM and Victor Harbor 99.7 FM

Sea FM
Sea FM 107.7 FM - Devonport
Sea FM 101.7 FM - Burnie

Adult Contemporary
7HO FM 101.7 FM - Hobart
Mix 104.9 104.9 FM and DAB+ - Darwin, translators at Adelaide River 98.1 FM, Bathurst Island 89.7 FM, and Katherine 106.9 FM
River 94.9 94.9 FM - Ipswich
Hitz FM 93.9 FM - Bundaberg
Hot 91 91.1 FM - Sunshine Coast
96.5 Wave FM 96.5 FM - Wollongong
89.3 LAFM 89.3 FM - Launceston, translator at Launceston City 100.3 FM.
4CC, 927 AM Gladstone, 1584 AM Rockhampton, 666 AM Biloela, 98.3 FM Agnes Water, Queensland.

Rock

Zinc/Star Network
 Star 102.7 Cairns
 Star 101.9 Mackay
 Star 106.3 - Townsville
 Zinc 96.1 Sunshine Coast
 Power 100.7 Townsville

Classic/Adult Hits
2EC 765 AM - Bega, translators at Batemans Bay 105.9 FM, Narooma 1584 AM and Eden 105.5 FM. Batemans Bay has some local programming.
2NM 981 AM - Muswellbrook
2ST 999 AM - Nowra, (Format: Music and Talk), translators at Ulladulla 106.7 FM, Shoalhaven 91.7 FM and Bowral 102.9 FM. Bowral has some local programming.
3BA 102.3 FM - Ballarat
Gold Ten-71 1071 AM - Maryborough (Victoria), translator at Bendigo 98.3 FM 
River 1467AM 1467 AM - Mildura
4BU 1332 AM - Bundaberg
4CA 846 AM - Cairns
4MK 1026 AM - Mackay
4RO 990 AM - Rockhampton
5AU 97.9 FM - Port Augusta translator at Roxby Downs on 96.3 FM and Quorn on 99.1 FM
5CC 765 AM & 93.9 FM - Port Lincoln translator at Cleve on 99.5 FM
5CS 1044 AM - Port Pirie
5MU 96.3 FM - Murray Bridge, translators at 94.3 FM Mount Barker and 97.1 FM Victor Harbor
5RM 801 AM & 91.5 FM - Renmark & 89.9 FM Waikerie
7AD 98.9 FM - Devonport
7BU 100.9 FM - Burnie, translator at Smithton 94.5 FM
7SD 95.7 FM & 540 AM - Scottsdale, translators St.Marys 105.1 FM and St.Helens 92.1 FM.
7XS 92.1 FM - Queenstown, translators at Strahan 105.1 FM and Mount Read 107.1 FM.
Classic Rock DAB+ - Darwin

KIX Country Radio Network
Wollongong 105.3 FM 
Geelong 89.3 FM 
Hobart DAB+ Digital
Muswellbrook 94.5 FM 
Nowra 101.1 FM 
Bowral 1215 AM 
Bega 88.0 FM (Narrowcast)
Batemans Bay 87.6 FM (Narrowcast)
Moruya 88.0 FM (Narrowcast)
Narooma 97.7 FM 
Bermagui 87.6 FM (Narrowcast)
Tathra 87.6 FM (Narrowcast)
Merimbula 88.0 FM (Narrowcast)
Pambula 87.8 FM (Narrowcast)
Eden 87.6 FM (Narrowcast)
Barossa Valley 90.5 FM
Darwin 92.3 FM and DAB+ Digital 
Townsville 89.9FM (Narrowcast)
Mackay 93.9 FM 
Bundaberg 97.1 FM 
Hervey Bay 92.3 FM 
Maryborough (Queensland) 92.3 FM 
Agnes Water/1770 87.6 FM 
Sarajl 92.1 FM 
Middlemount 94.1 FM
Yeppoon 96.1 FM 
Rockhampton 92.7 FM 
Gladstone 88.0 FM (Narrowcast)
Lowood 88.0 FM (Narrowcast)
Blair Athol 97.5 FM 
Dysart 90.9 FM 
Tlerl 92.1 FM 
Alpha 100.7 FM 
Emerald 88.0 FM (Narrowcast)
Injune 101.9 FM 
Mitchell 103.7 FM 
Yuleba 89.5 FM 
Surat 94.7 FM 
Inglewood 98.1 FM 
Berri & Renmark 1557 AM 
Port Lincoln 87.6 FM (Narrowcast)
Clare 87.6 FM (Narrowcast)
Port Pirie 87.6 FM (Narrowcast)

References

External links

Australian Radio Network
Australian radio networks
Companies based in Sydney
Mass media companies established in 2022
2022 establishments in Australia
Australian companies established in 2022